Jeremy Abbott (born June 5, 1985) is a former American figure skater. He is the 2008 Grand Prix Final champion, a two-time (2007, 2011) Four Continents bronze medalist, and a four-time (2009, 2010, 2012, 2014) U.S. national champion. He represented the United States at the 2010 Winter Olympics, where he placed ninth, and at the 2014 Winter Olympics, winning a bronze medal in the team event.

Personal life
Jeremy Abbott was born in Aspen, Colorado to Allison and Danny Abbott. He has an elder sister, Gwen Abbott, a nationally ranked downhill skier who competed in the X Games as a ski racer, and a younger brother. He attended Cheyenne Mountain High School for five years, stretching his high school career out one year longer than the usual, so he could concentrate on both skating and getting good grades. He graduated in 2004.

In January 2015, Abbott's father, Danny Abbott, died from complications of Parkinson's Disease.

In addition to his coaches, Jeremy Abbott cites his family—mother Allison Scott, stepfather Allen Scott, his late father Danny Abbott, and sister Gwen Abbott,—as the pillars of his success. Following his win on the junior level at 2005 US nationals, Abbott established a fund in Aspen, Colorado, to help up-and-coming skaters to pay for training. In 2006, he established a second fund for skaters in the surrounding area.

Abbott came out as gay in June 2020.

Skating career

Early years
Abbott began skating at age two. He began competing at age four after seeing and becoming inspired by Robin Cousins. He has competed in three figure skating disciplines. As a juvenile, he competed in ice dancing with Amanda Cunningham from 1995–96 and with Katie Hoffmaster from 1997–98. He competed as a pair skater with Brittany Vise in 1998–99 and Krystal Sorenson from 2001–02.

In his early years, Abbott was coached by Peggy Behr in Aspen, Colorado. In 1999, Abbott moved from Aspen to Colorado Springs, Colorado, to train at the Colorado Springs World Arena with Tom Zakrajsek. He began representing the Broadmoor Skating Club.

Abbott began competing in singles at the novice level in the 2000–01 season, but failed to make it out of sectionals. The next year he made it to Nationals, where he placed 6th at the novice level.

For the 2002–03 and 2004–05 seasons, Abbott competed on the junior level nationally, though he did not reach 2003 nationals at the junior level. He fractured his L5 vertebra in 2003, which kept him off the ice for fifteen weeks leading up to Regionals, yet he was able to win Regionals, and go on to place 7th at the 2004 U.S. Championships.

He won the Junior national title at the 2005 U.S. Championships. A remark he made during this competition, "Stranger things could happen; pigs could fly!", led him to adopt as his mascot a pig with wings, or a flying pig. Abbott made it the slogan of his charitable fund, which he started to give back to young male skaters struggling to pay coaching fees, ice time and competition fees.

2005–2008
Abbott was given his first senior international assignment in the 2005–06 Olympic season, placing 18th at the 2005 Nebelhorn Trophy. Abbott, then, placed fifth at the very competitive Midwestern Sectionals, and just missed a chance to go on to Nationals and compete for an Olympic berth. Abbott later blamed his performance on his poor training habits, and said that he had become lazy after winning the junior national title; failing to make it out of sectionals gave him the motivation he needed.

In the 2006–07 season, Abbott was given another international assignment, this time to the 2006 Finlandia Trophy, which he won. He won sectionals and advanced to Nationals, where he won the pewter medal, the highest placement for a first-timer in the senior men's event at nationals in twenty years. Abbott was named the first alternate to the World and Four Continents teams. When Johnny Weir withdrew from the 2007 Four Continents, Abbott was given the opportunity to compete at the event, which was held at his home rink, World Arena, Colorado Springs. He beat out U.S. silver medalist and training mate Ryan Bradley for the bronze medal.

In the 2007–08 season, Abbott debuted on the Grand Prix circuit, placing 8th at the 2007 Skate Canada and 4th at the 2007 NHK Trophy. At the 2008 U.S. Championships, he again won the pewter medal. He placed 5th at the 2008 Four Continents. He was sent to the 2008 World Championships after Evan Lysacek withdrew with injury, and placed 11th.

2008–2009
In the 2008–09 season, Abbott had a breakthrough season on the Grand Prix circuit. He won the 2008 Cup of China and placed fourth at the 2008 Cup of Russia to qualify for the 2008–09 Grand Prix Final. He won the Grand Prix Final, becoming the first American man to do so, and achieved the highest total free skate score for an American man at that time. At the 2009 U.S. Championships in Cleveland, Abbott won both the short program and the free skate to win the gold medal. At the 2009 World Championships, Abbot placed 10th in both the short and long programs and 11th overall. In the off-season, he performed at the Festa On Ice show in South Korea, his first ice show in a foreign country.

In May 2009, Abbott changed coaches to Yuka Sato in Bloomfield Hills, Michigan.

2009–2010 season
Abbott began the 2009–10 season with a 5th-place finish at the 2009 NHK Trophy. He then won the 2009 Skate Canada to qualify once again for the Grand Prix Final, where he placed fourth. At the 2010 U.S. Championships, Abbott won both segments of the competition to win the title overall, finishing 25 points ahead of the second place Evan Lysacek. He was named to the Olympic team. At the 2010 Olympics, Abbott placed 15th place in the short program, with a score of 69.40. Abbott earned a score of 149.56 in the free skate, placing 9th in that segment of the competition and moving up to place 9th overall. At the 2010 World Championships, he skated a strong short to place 6th in the segment. In the long program, he fell on the quad and double axel and placed 5th overall. In the off-season, Abbott performed on the Stars on Ice tour.

2010–2011 season
Abbott decided to remain with Sato for the 2010–11 season. In a November 2011 interview, he said he was seeing a sports psychologist once a week. He also works with Jason Dungjen. His training was hampered by his first serious boot problems of his career. Abbott explained, "I could not get the blades mounted quite right, and they were never quite comfortable". He went through eight pairs of boots. The problems were resolved toward the end of the season.

At the 2011 U.S. Championships, Abbott was second after the short program but struggled through parts of his long program to finish fourth overall. He won his third pewter medal with a total score of 224.16, missing the bronze medal by just 0.19 points. The selection committee decided to leave him off the 2011 Worlds team, disappointing Abbott who thought the rules stated that other results would be taken into consideration. He was named to the team to the 2011 Four Continents instead, where he won the bronze medal behind Japanese skaters Daisuke Takahashi and Yuzuru Hanyu.

2011–2012 season
For the 2011–12 Grand Prix season, Abbott was assigned to compete at 2011 Cup of China and 2011 Cup of Russia. He later said they were not the two he had asked for but that it had worked out well. He placed third in both programs at Cup of China and came away with the gold medal overall. At Cup of Russia, Abbott won the short program with a new personal best of 83.54 points. He was fifth in the free program and won the bronze medal overall. He qualified for his third Grand Prix Final.

At the 2012 U.S. Championships, Abbott placed first in both programs and won his third national title. He withdrew from the 2012 Four Continents due to back spasms and was replaced by 13th-placed Richard Dornbush. He won the silver medal at the 2012 Challenge Cup in The Hague. He finished 8th at the 2012 Worlds.

2012–2013 season
Abbott was 5th at his first Grand Prix event of the season, the 2012 Skate America. Early in the season, he had a compressed disk in his lower back, which also caused nerve problems in his legs, but his condition began to improve by his next event in France. He won the silver medal at the 2012 Trophee Eric Bompard. At a practice at the 2013 U.S. Championships he was informed that one of his spins would not count and changed it before competing. He won bronze at the event, behind champion Max Aaron and silver medalist Ross Miner.

2013–2014 season
During an interview for "The Skating Lesson Podcast" Abbott told Jennifer Kirk that the 2013–14 would be his last and that he would again use his Exogenesis: Symphony long program from the 2011–12 season. He came in sixth at his first Grand Prix assignment, the 2013 Skate Canada International, and won the bronze medal at the second, the 2013 NHK Trophy. At the 2014 U.S. Championships, he placed first in the short program and second to Jason Brown in the free skate. Abbott finished first overall and was named in the U.S. team to the 2014 Winter Olympics in Sochi, Russia. He was awarded a team bronze medal. He went on to compete at the World Championships, where he had a fourth place free skate and placed fifth overall. Combined with teammate Max Aaron's 8th-place finish, the US Men gained back their third spot.

2014–2015 season
Abbott was given assignments for Skate America and NHK Trophy for the 2014–15 season. He placed 5th at both events.

Shortly before the 2015 U.S. Figure Skating Championships, Abbott's father died from Parkinson's disease. Despite this hardship, Abbott decided to compete anyway and finished 5th. During the gala, Abbott paid a tribute to his late father.

2015–2016 season and after
At the beginning of the 2015–2016 season, Abbott stated that he would sit out the season, but said he did not plan on retiring. In October 2015, he participated in the 2015 Japan Open, a team event in Japan. In January 2016, he won gold at the 2016 Medal Winners Open, an ISU-sanctioned pro-am competition held in Japan.

During the 2016–2017 season, Abbott participated in the 2016 Japan Open.  At the end of the season, he announced his retirement from competition.

Coaching & Choreographer Career 

Since retiring from competition, Abbott has started choreographing and coaching. He has choreographed programs for former two-time US National Champion Gracie Gold. As a coach, he has started working with reigning two-time US National Champion Alysa Liu, and also Dinh Tran.

Programs

2015–2016 to present

2004–2005 to 2014–2015

Competitive highlights
GP: Grand Prix

2015–2016 to present

1995–1996 to 2014–2015

Detailed results 
Small medals for short and free programs awarded only at ISU Championships. At team events, medals awarded for team results only.

Senior career

References

External links

 
 
 Jeremy Abbott  at IceNetwork
 
 
 

American male single skaters
1985 births
Living people
Sportspeople from Aspen, Colorado
Figure skaters at the 2010 Winter Olympics
Figure skaters at the 2014 Winter Olympics
Four Continents Figure Skating Championships medalists
Medalists at the 2014 Winter Olympics
Olympic medalists in figure skating
Olympic bronze medalists for the United States in figure skating
American LGBT sportspeople
LGBT figure skaters
LGBT people from Colorado
Gay sportsmen